The Catalina 310 is an American sailboat, that was designed by Gerry Douglas and first built in 1999.

Production
The boat was built by Catalina Yachts in the United States, with more than 300 examples completed, but it is now out of production. It was replaced in production in 2012 by the Catalina 315.

Design

The Catalina 310 is a small recreational keelboat, built predominantly of fiberglass, with wood trim. It has a masthead sloop rig, an internally-mounted spade-type rudder and a fixed fin keel. It displaces  and carries  of ballast.

The boat has a PHRF racing average handicap of 171 with a high of 181 and low of 165.

Operational history
At its introduction, at the February 1999 Atlantic City Boat Show, it was named Cruising World Magazine's Pocket Cruiser Boat of the Year.

In February 2000, the design was named to Sail Magazine's Top 10 sailboats for 2000 list.

See also
List of sailing boat types

Similar sailboats
Allmand 31
Beneteau 31
Corvette 31
Douglas 31
Herreshoff 31
Hunter 31
Hunter 31-2
Hunter 310
Hunter 320
Marlow-Hunter 31
Niagara 31
Tanzer 31

References

External links

Keelboats
1990s sailboat type designs
Sailing yachts
Sailboat types built by Catalina Yachts
Sailboat type designs by Gerry Douglas